NK Raštane is a Croatian football club located in the village of Gornje Raštane, near the city of Zadar.

Honours 

 Treća HNL – South:
Winners (2): 2010–11, 2011–12

Football clubs in Croatia
Football clubs in Zadar County
Association football clubs established in 1976
1976 establishments in Croatia